Macropod may refer to:
 Macropodidae, a marsupial family which includes kangaroos, wallabies, tree-kangaroos, pademelons, and several others
 Macropodiformes, a marsupial suborder which includes kangaroos, wallabies and allies, bettongs, potoroos, and rat kangaroos

Animal common name disambiguation pages